Maâmar Ousser (born 7 February 1935) was a professional Algerian footballer who played as a full-back.

Honour

Career statistics

Club

References

1935 births
Algerian footballers
USM Blida players
Association football defenders
Living people
People from Blida
21st-century Algerian people